Richard Young (born 1947) is an English society and celebrity photographer. His photography career started in 1974 and since then, he has photographed personalities such as Diana, Princess of Wales, Elizabeth Taylor, and Mick Jagger.

Early life
Young grew up in North London. He left school when he was 15 and worked in a boutique in King's Road. In 1968, he went to Paris where he spent nine months working with advertising and fashion photographer, John Bishop.  In the early 1970s, he moved to New York City where his girlfriend was photographer Flo Fox. He returned to London in the spring of 1974 and worked at a bookshop on Regent Street.

Career

Early
In 1974, Young's career in photography began when he was asked to take pictures for a book written by John Cowper Powys. Later that year, he was invited to photograph philanthropist John Paul Getty III as he went around London. These pictures earned him a job as a freelance photographer at the Evening Standard. He then worked with gossip magazine, Ritz Magazine, from 1976 to 1983, where he was given free rein to publish whatever pictures he wanted. Among Young's early photographs is a photograph taken of Keith Moon dining with Paul McCartney, hours before Moon died. Another is a photograph taken of Elizabeth Taylor kissing Richard Burton at his 50th birthday party at the Dorchester.

Present
Currently, Young continues his career as a celebrity photographer and has worked with the photographic agency Rex Features for three decades. He and his wife, Susan Young, own their own gallery called the Richard Young Gallery in Kensington. His work as well as those by other photographers, is displayed at the gallery. His diverse portfolio includes Diana, Princess of Wales, Joan Collins, Elizabeth II, Kate Moss, Andy Warhol, Bob Marley, Stevie Wonder, Marvin Gaye, Jennifer Aniston and Mick Jagger among many others. Young has also photographed important political and cultural events including United States troops in Iraq and Fidel Castro in Cuba.  He has also visited orphanages in Romania with Michael Jackson and photographed the 46664 benefit for Nelson Mandela. In 2006, The Times named him as "one of the most important photographers of the 20th century". In May and June 2012, Young's career was the subject of the documentary series Celebrity Exposed: The Photography of Richard Young, shown on Sky Arts. The four episodes of Celebrity Exposed featured exclusive interviews with a host of celebrity royalty including Kate Moss, Sir Elton John, Vivienne Westwood, Steven Berkoff, Tracey Emin, and many more.

Awards and achievements
Over the summer of 2012 Richard was presented the Ischia Art Award at the Ischia Film Festival in Italy while concurrently exhibiting 40 years worth of his photographs of Elizabeth Taylor at the Colombaia Museum during the festival. The next year, In March 2013, Champagne Bureau UK crowned Richard Young with its first ever Le Prix Champagne de la Joie de Vivre prize. in July 2013, Richard received an Honorary Fellowship and the title Honorary Doctor in recognition of his outstanding contribution to the Field of Photography from University of the Arts London. In October 2013, Richard Young's candid photograph of Freddie Mercury at home was inducted into the National Portrait Gallery, London. In the summer of 2014, Richard was inducted into the prestigious Champagne wine fraternity "L’Ordre des Côteaux de Champagne" in the stunning setting of Le Palais du Tau. In February 2015 the UK Picture Editors Guild presented the Chairman's Award to Richard for his significant contribution and talent in the field of photography.

Personal life
Young and Susan have three children; Dan, Sam and Hannah.

Books
By Invitation Only by Richard Young (photographs) and Christopher Wilson (text), (1981) 
Paparazzo! by Richard Young (photographs) and Sally Moulsdale (text), (1989) 
Shooting Stars by Richard Young (photographs) and Susan Young (text) 
Nightclubbing by Richard Young (photographs) and Susan Young (text)

References

External links
Richard Young Gallery
Richard Young Photography

1947 births
Living people